The Nyeboe Land Formation is a formation of the Peary Land Group in Greenland. It preserves fossils dating back to the Silurian period.

See also

 List of fossiliferous stratigraphic units in Greenland

References

Silurian Greenland